The lautenwerck (also spelled lautenwerk), alternatively called lute-harpsichord (lute-clavier) or keyboard lute, is a European keyboard instrument of the Baroque period. It is similar to a harpsichord, but with gut (sometimes Nylon) rather than metal strings (except for the 4 ft Register on some instruments), producing a mellow tone.

The instrument was favored by J. S. Bach, who owned two of the instruments at the time of his death, but no specimens from the eighteenth century have survived to the present day. It has been revived since the twentieth century by harpsichord makers Willard Martin, Keith Hill, and Steven Sorli. Two of its most prominent performers are the early music specialists Gergely Sárközy and Robert Hill.

Media

Performances by Gergely Sárközy also are freely available.

Notes

References

External links

Lautenwerck page
Information (Tihamér Romanek)
Gallery of pictures and sounds (Stevie Sorli)

Early musical instruments
Harpsichord
Baroque instruments
Keyboard instruments